Madkour is a surname. Notable people with the surname include:
Abdelilah Madkour (born 2000), Moroccan footballer
Hussein Madkour (1919–2001), Egyptian Olympic footballer
Mary Madkour (1927–2013), American politician
Mohamed Madkour (fl. 1924), Egyptian Olympic cyclist
Nazli Madkour (born 1949), Egyptian artist
Rachid Madkour (born 1977), Moroccan footballer